The Maro River also known as Sungai Merauke and  Merauke-rivier, Merauki River  flows in Merauke Regency, Papua, Indonesia. It is located just to the west of the Bensbach River of Western Province, Papua New Guinea.

Hydrology 
The Maro flows from north-east to south-west, into the Arafura Sea. Its total length is 207 km and width around 48 - 900.1 m. The river is strongly tidal for most of its length and its lower reaches are affected by salt water. The main tributaries are Obat, also known as Oba. Associated with the river is a complex system of swamps and oxbow lakes which are of great importance for a large number of birds and reptiles. The Maro river borders the northern side of Wasur National Park.

Geography
The river flows in the southern area of Papua with predominantly tropical monsoon climate (designated as Am in the Köppen-Geiger climate classification). The annual average temperature in the area is 23 °C. The warmest month is September, when the average temperature is around 26 °C, and the coldest is May, at 21 °C. The average annual rainfall is 2238 mm. The wettest month is February, with an average of 445 mm rainfall, and the driest is August, with 29 mm rainfall.

See also
List of rivers of Indonesia
List of rivers of Western New Guinea

References

Rivers of South Papua
Rivers of Indonesia